Harry Roeck-Hansen (né Hansen; 1891–1959) was a Swedish stage and film actor. He was married to the actresses Ester Roeck-Hansen and Ruth Stevens.

Selected filmography
 Thomas Graal's Ward (1922)
 The Counts at Svansta (1924)
 Charles XII (1925)
 Hotel Paradis (1931)
 What Do Men Know? (1933)
 The Marriage Game (1935)
 The Wedding Trip (1936)
 Art for Art's Sake (1938)
 Hanna in Society (1940)
 The Bjorck Family (1940)
 In Paradise (1941)

References

Bibliography 
 Klossner, Michael. The Europe of 1500-1815 on Film and Television: A Worldwide Filmography of Over 2550 Works, 1895 Through 2000. McFarland & Company, 2002.

External links 
 

Male actors from Stockholm
1891 births
1959 deaths
Swedish male film actors
Swedish male silent film actors
20th-century Swedish male actors
Swedish male stage actors